Raymond Dupont (born 27 December 1942) was a Canadian technical and labour consultant, businessman and politician. He was a Liberal party member of the House of Commons of Canada.

He was elected at Sainte-Marie electoral district in the 1972 federal election and was re-elected there in 1974. In the 1979 election, he campaigned in the Chambly electoral district and won re-election there. After one more victory in the 1980 election, he was defeated in 1984 by Richard Grisé of the Progressive Conservative party. He made another unsuccessful attempt to re-enter federal politics in the 1988 election at Saint-Hubert riding.

Dupont served four consecutive terms of office from the 29th to the 32nd Canadian Parliaments.

External links
 

1942 births
Businesspeople from Montreal
Liberal Party of Canada MPs
Living people
Members of the House of Commons of Canada from Quebec
Politicians from Montreal